Chalivendrapalem is a village in Kankipadu mandal, located in Krishna district of Indian state of Andhra Pradesh.

References 

Villages in Krishna district